The Portugal national under-18 football team is the association football team that represents the nation of Portugal at the under-18 level.

Current squad
 The following players were called up for the Football at the 2022 Mediterranean Games.
 Match dates: 26 June – 5 July 2022
 Caps and goals correct as of:''' 14 June 2022, after the match against

Recent call-ups
The following players have been called up within the last twelve months, and still ineglible for selection.

Competition records

FIFA Junior Tournament/UEFA European Under-19 Football Championship
Champions (3): 1961, 1994, 1999
Runners-up (5): 1964, 1971, 1988, 1992, 1997
Third-place (2): 1960, 1968
Fourth-place (2): 1993, 1998

References

European national under-18 association football teams
F